This is the discography for German thrash metal band Destruction.

Studio albums 

Note: Released during the Neo-Destruction period.

Live albums

Compilations

EPs 

Note: Released during the Neo-Destruction period.

Demos

Music videos

References

Heavy metal group discographies
Discographies of German artists